Harry Bähre (born 22 July 1941) is a former German footballer.

He played for Hamburger SV in the Bundesliga from 1963 to 1967, scoring two goals in 78 games. In 1963, when the Bundesliga was founded the Hamburger SV sent the licence documents very early to the German Football Association and so Bähre got the licence number 001.

References

External links
 

1941 births
Living people
German footballers
Hamburger SV players
Bundesliga players

Association football midfielders